The 2021 Sportsbet.io CONIFA European Football Cup, later renamed CONIFA Euro 2022 is the planned fourth edition of the CONIFA European Football Cup, an international football tournament for states, minorities, stateless peoples and regions unaffiliated with FIFA with an affiliation to Europe, organised by CONIFA. It will be hosted by Nice in France.

Initially to be played from 9 to 19 June, it was postponed to 7–17 July due to the ongoing pandemic, and finally cancelled on 6 May 2021. The organisers stated that they were hoping to make a decision to hold the competition in 2022, by August 2022. On 10 January 2022, CONIFA announced on social media, that the competition would be taking place between 3–12 June 2022 and had been renamed CONIFA Euro 2022 - in Nice as previously planned.

Less than 1 month before the tournament was due to begin CONIFA announced organisation problems with regards to hosts Nice. The tournament was not officially declared cancelled, but no alternative host was announced.

Tournament

Venues

Participants
A total of twelve teams were scheduled to participate, with their seedings below.

Northern Cyprus withdrew from the tournament after the draw. It was replaced by a reserve team of the tournament, Two Sicilies.

In April 2022,  and  Chameria all withdrew. The official reason given was "organizational issues".

In May 2022,  withdrew from the tournament due to "safety reasons".

Squads

Matches

Group stage

Group A

Group B

Group C

Group D

Knockout stage

Quarter-finals

Semi-finals

Third-place play-off

Final

Placement round

Placement round 1

Placement round 2

Final positions

Top scorers

References 

CONIFA European Football Cup
CONIFA European Football Cup
Sport in Nice
Sport in France
Football competitions in France